Gastrioceras is a goniatitid genus in the family Gastrioceratidae that lived during the late Carboniferous (Pennsylvanian and for most of the Permian.

Taxonomy
Gastrioceras is assigned  to the Gastrioceratidae, a family that makes up part of the Gastriocerataceae, known in more recent references as Gastrioceratoidea.
,

Morphology
The Gastrioceras shell, or conch, is subdiscoidal to subglobose in form with  moderate to wide umbilicus. Ornament varies according to species, varying from simple transverse lirae to reticulate produced by the addition of faint longitudinal lirae. The umbilical shoulder is nodose, nodes elongated transversely. Some species have rather strong ribs.

The suture is characterized by a ventral lobe with two attenuated prongs separated by a high median saddle. The lateral lobe is generally nearly symmetrical, becoming attenuated on mature specimens.

References

Goniatitida genera
Gastrioceratidae
Pennsylvanian first appearances
Permian genus extinctions
Paleozoic life of Nunavut